This is a list of regions of Eswatini by Human Development Index as of 2021.

References 

Eswatini
Human Development Index
Regions by Human Development Index